Zanthoxylum ovalifolium, commonly known as thorny yellowwood, oval-leaf yellow wood or little yellowwood, is a species of flowering plant in the family Rutaceae. It is a shrub or tree usually with trifoliate leaves, white, male and female flowers arranged in panicles in leaf axils or on the ends of branchlets and red, purple or brown follicles.

Description

Taxonomy
Zanthoxylum ovalifolium was first formally described in 1839 by Robert Wight in his book, Illustrations of Indian Botany, from specimens collected in the "Shevagerry hills in flower, and fruit in August and September".

Distribution and habitat
Thorny yellowwood is a widespread species, found from India, through southeast Asia, Malesia, New Guinea, and Queensland.

Uses

Timber
Thorny yellowwood is a timber tree valued for its hard, yellowish-white, close-grained wood.

Medicinal uses
The fruits of this species are reported to have "astringent, stimulative, and digestive properties".

Essential oils
The fruits yield the essential oils myrcene and safrole.

References

ovalifolium
Plants described in 1839
Taxa named by Robert Wight
Flora of Queensland
Flora of China
Flora of tropical Asia